The 1946 Marquette Hilltoppers football team was an American football team that represented Marquette University during the 1946 college football season. In its 16th season under head coach Frank Murray, the team compiled a 4–5 record and was outscored by a total of 148 to 132. The team played its home games at Marquette Stadium in Milwaukee.

Schedule

After the season

The 1947 NFL Draft was held on December 16, 1946. The following Hilltopper was selected.

References

Marquette
Marquette Golden Avalanche football seasons
Marquette Hilltoppers football